Captain Lord William Paget (1 March 1803 – 17 May 1873) was a British naval commander and Whig politician.

Paget was the second son of Field Marshal Henry Paget, 1st Marquess of Anglesey, by his first wife Lady Caroline Elizabeth, daughter of George Villiers, 4th Earl of Jersey, and Frances Villiers, Countess of Jersey. He was the brother of Henry Paget, 2nd Marquess of Anglesey and the half-brother of Lord Clarence Paget, Lord Alfred Paget and Lord George Paget. Paget served in the Royal Navy and achieved the rank of Captain. He also served as the Member of Parliament (MP) for Carnarvon from 1826 to 1830 (succeeding his uncle Sir Charles Paget) and Andover from 1841 to 1847.

He was made a post captain, in the Royal Navy on 18 Oct0ber 1826, and was appointed captain of the vice-regal yacht HMS Royal Charlotte in November 1827 on a salary of £1,200, by the duke of Clarence for the duration of Paget's fathers, Irish lord lieutenancy.

In 1828 he spoke in the House of Commons on the subject of Roman Catholic emancipation.

Paget married Frances, daughter of Lieutenant-General Francis de Rottenburg, Baron de Rottenburg, in 1827. They had several children, including William Henry Paget, a Major-General in the Indian Army. Paget died in May 1873, aged 70. Lady William Paget survived him by two years and died in May 1875.

See also

References

External links

1803 births
1873 deaths
Whig (British political party) MPs for English constituencies
Whig (British political party) MPs for Welsh constituencies
William
Royal Navy officers
UK MPs 1826–1830
UK MPs 1841–1847
Younger sons of marquesses
Members of Parliament for Caernarfon